Dorothy  Jordan Waters (née Manning, 21 August 1919 – 31 May 2012) was a New Zealand artist.

Works by Manning include 'Road to sea' and are in the collection of the Museum of New Zealand Te Papa Tongarewa.

Career 
Manning exhibited with New Zealand art societies including: Auckland Society of Arts; Canterbury Society of Arts; New Zealand Academy of Fine Arts. She was also a member of the Canterbury-based art association 'The Group', and exhibited with them in: 1945; 1947; 1948; 1949; 1950; 1951; 1952; 1954; 1955; 1956; 1957; 1961; 1962.

She was part of the council for the Canterbury Society of Arts.

Personal life 
She was the wife of Leo Campbell Waters.

References

Further reading 
Artist files for Dorothy Manning are held at:
 E. H. McCormick Research Library, Auckland Art Gallery Toi o Tāmaki
 Robert and Barbara Stewart Library and Archives, Christchurch Art Gallery Te Puna o Waiwhetu
 Te Aka Matua Research Library, Museum of New Zealand Te Papa Tongarewa

1919 births
2012 deaths
New Zealand painters
People associated with the Museum of New Zealand Te Papa Tongarewa
People associated with the Canterbury Society of Arts
New Zealand women painters
People associated with the Auckland Society of Arts
People associated with The Group (New Zealand art)